Qusai Kheder (born 1978), known by the stage name Qusai, is a Saudi American hip hop artist, singer/songwriter, record producer, rapper, television personality, voice actor and DJ. He is the first professional Saudi hip hop artist.

In addition to his music career, Qusai has appeared on television as the co-host of Hip Hop Na on MTV Arabia with hip-hop producer Fredwreck, and as a co-host, with Raya Abirached, on MBC4's Arabs Got Talent.

Biography

Early years and early music career
Qusai Kheder was born in Riyadh and raised in Jeddah in the Kingdom of Saudi Arabia. A fan of hip-hop since childhood, Kheder began performing and DJing at the age of 15.

At age 17 in 1996, Kheder moved to the United States to attend college, first to Vermont, and later to the University of Central Florida in Orlando, Florida.<ref>"Qusai (Saudi Arabia/Florida)". Hip Hop Diplomacy</ref>

With the introduction of new partners, Eyesomnia Productions evolved into Eyesomnia Enterprises by 2004. Under the Eyesomnia label, Don Legend released two solo albums, and also recorded two EPs and a full album as part of the duo Urban Legacy with fellow MC D-Light. The track "Jeddah (My Hometown City)" from his first independent album, The Life of a Lost Soul, began a buzz for the artist in his hometown back in Saudi Arabia. Legend performed regularly at several performance venues and music events in the Orlando area during the early to mid-2000s. He also performed in shows in Chicago, Atlanta, New York, and other major US cities.

Return to Saudi Arabia
Don Legend returned to Saudi Arabia in 2005, changing his stage name to Qusai and signing with Platinum Records, based in. His first album for Platinum was 2008's Don Legend the Kamelion, which sold over 20,000 copies in the Middle East and remained the number one album on the KSA Music Master charts for three consecutive weeks. His second album, Experimental Edutainment (2010), sold 30,000 copies and was the number one album on the Virgin top albums chart in the Persian Gulf region for four consecutive weeks. These sales were achieved without international distribution or online sales.

Qusai records and performs in both Arabic and English. Two of his singles, "The Wedding" (2008) and "The Job" (2010) have been number-one songs on Wanasah's Top 10 list and on 103 MBC FM. In (May 3, 2014) he came up with a new song "Dream" feat Anas Arabi, who associated with a songwriter "Baker Sanusi", a member of the "Sony Music Entertainment".  The video for Qusai's single, "Mother", premiered on the MBC television network to coincide with Mother's Day (March 21) in 2009. Qusai continues to perform throughout Europe and the Middle East.

Television
In addition to his music, Qusai began working in television as well. He and fellow Arabic hip hop artist Fredwreck hosted Hip Hop Na (Our Hip-Hop), a hip-hop talent search contest show, for MTV Arabia in 2007.Hip Hop Na became the first Arabic hip-hop show and the flagship show for MTV Arabia. In 2009, Qusai and Fredwreck began hosting Beit el Hip Hop (The House of Hip-Hop) on Wanasah TV. On January 14, 2011, Qusai began appearing as the co-host, with Raya Abi Rached, of Arabs Got Talent on MBC4. In (2011) also, he hosted his first stage show in "Dubai" with "Anas Arabi". 
He also sang with many singers like Ludacris, Akon, Karl Wolf and others.

Discography

Major label releasesDon Legend the Kamelion (2008)Experimental Edutainment (2010)The Inevitable Change'' (2012)
 "BassLine ep" (2016)
 "Saudi ep" (2017)

Singles and music videos
2008: "The Wedding"
2008: "Hayo Al-Saudi"
2009: "That's Life"
2009: "Mother"
2010: "The Job"
2010: "Any Given Day"
2010: "Father"
2011: "Everyone Can Play"
2012: "Yalla"
2012: "Change"
2013: "Eve"
2013: "Arab World Unite"
2014: "Dream", "I'm Cool"
2015: "Umm El-Dunia"
2016: "Gone"
2017: "All the way"
2017: "Saudi"
2018: "Get Lost"
2018: "The Teacher"
2019: "Kan Yama Kan"
2019: "Heat it up"
2020: "My time"
2020: "Dar Dyali"

TV commercials
PepsiCo / Zain Telecom / Chrysler / Souk.com / Hyundai / OMO 
Qusai also voiced Chester Cheetah in the Arabic version of the Cheetos ad "Flamin' Hot Diss Track", which aired on March 11, 2020.

Television work

Filmography

Video Games

References

External links
Official Facebook page

Living people
1978 births
Hip hop record producers
21st-century Saudi Arabian male singers
People from Jeddah
Saudi Arabian hip hop
University of Central Florida alumni
Saudi Arabian male film actors
Saudi Arabian male television actors